Anthony "Tony" Rocco Martin (born December 11, 1989) is an American professional mixed martial artist who competed in the lightweight and welterweight divisions of the Ultimate Fighting Championship.

Background
Born in Palos Heights, Illinois, Martin moved to Worth, Illinois, before settling in Wisconsin during his junior high school years. After graduating high school, where he played football, Martin attended college and briefly played football at North Dakota State University before dropping out.  After dropping out Martin began training in Brazilian jiu-jitsu and mixed martial arts.

Mixed martial arts career
Martin made his professional mixed martial arts debut on January 7, 2012, when he faced Bruce Johnson at Cage Fighting Xtreme 30. He won the fight via first round rear-naked choke. Following the quick win, he compiled a record of 8–0, including a notable win over UFC veteran Phillipe Nover at Dakota FC 14, before being signed by the Ultimate Fighting Championship in late 2013.

Ultimate Fighting Championship
In his official UFC debut, Martin faced fellow newcomer Rashid Magomedov at UFC 169 on February 1, 2014. Though he had Magomedov in trouble early with a deep armbar, Magomedov rallied back and Martin lost the fight via unanimous decision.

Martin then faced Beneil Dariush at UFC Fight Night: Henderson vs. dos Anjos on August 23, 2014. Martin lost the fight via rear-naked choke in the second round.

For his third fight with the promotion, he faced Fabrício Camões in a catchweight bout (both fighters missed weight) at UFC 179 on October 25, 2014. He won the fight via first round kimura lock, getting his first UFC win in the process.

Martin next faced Leonardo Santos on March 21, 2015 at UFC Fight Night 62, as a replacement for an injured Matt Wiman. He lost the fight via submission in the second round.

Martin faced promotional newcomer Felipe Olivieri on January 30, 2016 at UFC on Fox 18. Martin earned a come from behind victory as he submitted Oilveiri in the third round.

Martin was expected to face Michel Prazeres on July 23, 2016 at UFC on Fox 20. However, Martin pulled out of the fight in early July citing a neck injury and was replaced by promotional newcomer J.C. Cottrell.

Martin was expected to face Erik Koch on January 15, 2017 at UFC Fight Night 103. However, Koch pulled out of the fight on December 12 citing an injury and was replaced by Alex White. He won the fight via unanimous decision.

Martin faced Johnny Case on June 25, 2017 at UFC Fight Night 112. He won the fight via unanimous decision.

Martin faced Olivier Aubin-Mercier on September 16, 2017 at UFC Fight Night 116. He lost the back-and-forth fight via split decision.

Martin faced Keita Nakamura in a welterweight bout on April 21, 2018 at UFC Fight Night 128. He won the fight via unanimous decision.

Martin faced Ryan LaFlare on October 6, 2018 at UFC 229. He won the fight via knockout in the third round after dropping LaFlare with a head kick and following up with punches. This victory marked Martin's first professional victory by way of knockout.

Martin faced Jake Matthews on December 2, 2018 at UFC Fight Night 142. He won the fight via an anaconda choke in round three.

Martin faced Sérgio Moraes on March 9, 2019 at UFC Fight Night 146. He won the fight by unanimous decision.

Martin faced Demian Maia on June 29, 2019 at UFC on ESPN: Ngannou vs. dos Santos. He lost the fight via majority decision.

Martin faced Ramazan Emeev on November 9, 2019 at UFC on ESPN+ 21.  He won the fight via unanimous decision.

Martin was scheduled to face David Zawada on April 25, 2020. However, on April 9 the promotion indicated that the pairing had been scrapped as a result of the COVID-19 pandemic.

As the last fight of his prevailing contract, Martin faced Neil Magny on June 6, 2020 at UFC 250. He lost the bout via unanimous decision. 

Martin and the UFC parted ways after the completion of his most recent contract allowing him to negotiate with other promotions.

Post UFC 
Martin made his first appearance since leaving the UFC headlining against Tim Bazer at CES 68 on May 6, 2022. He won the bout via brabo choke in the second round.

Legal incidents
Martin was arrested on November 23, 2021 for one count each of battery and lewd/dissolute conduct in a public place in Las Vegas for allegedly urinating in a hallway at Caesars Palace and punching a security officer in the throat after he was confronted. Martin was released later and is expected to appear in Las Vegas Justice Court on January 19, 2022

Mixed martial arts record

|-
|Win
|align=center|18–6
|Tim Bazer
|Submission (brabo choke)
|CES 68
|
|align=center|2
|align=center|1:05
|West Fargo, North Dakota, United States
|
|-
|Loss
|align=center|17–6
|Neil Magny
|Decision (unanimous)
|UFC 250
|
|align=center|3
|align=center|5:00
|Las Vegas, Nevada, United States
|
|-
|Win
|align=center|17–5
|Ramazan Emeev
|Decision (unanimous) 
|UFC Fight Night: Magomedsharipov vs. Kattar 
|
|align=center|3
|align=center|5:00
|Moscow, Russia
|
|-
|Loss
|align=center|16–5
|Demian Maia
|Decision (majority)
|UFC on ESPN: Ngannou vs. dos Santos 
|
|align=center|3
|align=center|5:00
|Minneapolis, Minnesota, United States
|
|-
|Win
|align=center|16–4
|Sérgio Moraes
|Decision (unanimous)
|UFC Fight Night: Lewis vs. dos Santos 
|
|align=center|3
|align=center|5:00
|Wichita, Kansas, United States
|
|-
|Win
|align=center|15–4
|Jake Matthews
|Technical Submission (anaconda choke)
|UFC Fight Night: dos Santos vs. Tuivasa 
|
|align=center|3
|align=center|1:19
|Adelaide, Australia
|
|-
|Win
|align=center|14–4
|Ryan LaFlare
|KO (head kick and punches)
|UFC 229 
|
|align=center|3
|align=center|1:00
|Las Vegas, Nevada, United States
|
|-
|Win
|align=center|13–4
|Keita Nakamura
|Decision (unanimous)
|UFC Fight Night: Barboza vs. Lee
|
|align=center|3
|align=center|5:00
|Atlantic City, New Jersey, United States
|
|-
|Loss
|align=center|12–4
|Olivier Aubin-Mercier
|Decision (split)
|UFC Fight Night: Rockhold vs. Branch 
|
|align=center|3
|align=center|5:00
|Pittsburgh, Pennsylvania, United States
|
|-
|Win
|align=center|12–3
|Johnny Case
|Decision (unanimous)
|UFC Fight Night: Chiesa vs. Lee
|
|align=center|3
|align=center|5:00
|Oklahoma City, Oklahoma, United States
|
|-
|Win
|align=center|11–3
|Alex White
|Decision (unanimous)
|UFC Fight Night: Rodríguez vs. Penn
|
|align=center|3
|align=center|5:00
|Phoenix, Arizona, United States
|
|-
|Win
|align=center|10–3
|Felipe Olivieri
|Technical Submission (rear-naked choke)
|UFC on Fox: Johnson vs. Bader
|
|align=center|3
|align=center|3:02
|Newark, New Jersey, United States
|
|-
|Loss
|align=center| 9–3
|Leonardo Santos
|Submission (rear-naked choke)
|UFC Fight Night: Maia vs. LaFlare
|
|align=center| 2
|align=center| 2:29
|Rio de Janeiro, Brazil
|
|-
|Win
|align=center| 9–2
|Fabrício Camões
|Submission (kimura)
|UFC 179
|
|align=center|1
|align=center|4:16
|Rio de Janeiro, Brazil
|
|-
|Loss
|align=center| 8–2
|Beneil Dariush
|Submission (arm-triangle choke)
|UFC Fight Night: Henderson vs. dos Anjos
|
|align=center|2
|align=center|3:38
|Tulsa, Oklahoma, United States
|
|-
|Loss
|align=center| 8–1
|Rashid Magomedov
|Decision (unanimous)
|UFC 169
|
|align=center|3
|align=center|5:00
|Newark, New Jersey, United States
|
|-
|Win
|align=center| 8–0
| Thomas Gifford
| Submission (americana)
| 3 River Throwndown 4
| 
| align=center|3
| align=center|5:00
|La Crescent, Minnesota, United States
|
|-
|Win
|align=center| 7–0
|Tyler Hellenbrand
|Decision (unanimous)
|Dakota FC 15
|
|align=center| 3
|align=center| 5:00
| Fargo, North Dakota, United States
|
|-
|Win
|align=center| 6–0
|Phillipe Nover
|Decision (majority)
|Dakota FC 14
|
|align=center| 3
|align=center| 5:00
|Fargo, North Dakota, United States
|
|-
|Win
|align=center| 5–0
|Ted Worthington
|Submission (kimura)
|CFX: Cage Fighting Xtreme
|
|align=center| 1
|align=center| 3:58
|Maplewood, Minnesota, United States
|
|-
|Win
|align=center| 4–0
|Jay Ellis
|Submission (guillotine choke)
|Cage Fighting Xtreme 39
|
|align=center| 1
|align=center| 0:51
|Maplewood, Minnesota, United States
|
|-
|Win
|align=center| 3–0
|Jonathan Knutson
|Submission (kimura)
|Throwdown at the Crowne 1
|
|align=center| 3
|align=center| 2:10
|St. Paul, Minnesota, United States
|
|-
|Win
|align=center| 2–0
|Kuchlong Kuchlong
|Submission (inverted triangle choke)
|Cage Fighting Xtreme 33
|
|align=center| 1
|align=center| 4:19
|Minneapolis, Minnesota, United States
|
|-
|Win
|align=center| 1–0
|Bruce Johnson
|Submission (rear-naked choke)
|Cage Fighting Xtreme 30
|
|align=center| 1
|align=center| 2:15
|St. Cloud, Minnesota, United States
|

See also
 List of male mixed martial artists

References

External links
 
 

1989 births
Living people
American male mixed martial artists
Lightweight mixed martial artists
Mixed martial artists utilizing Brazilian jiu-jitsu
People from Palos Heights, Illinois
Mixed martial artists from Illinois
American practitioners of Brazilian jiu-jitsu
People awarded a black belt in Brazilian jiu-jitsu
Ultimate Fighting Championship male fighters